Chandrika Gururaj (born 4 October 1959), is an Indian playback singer, known for her works in Kannada. Apart from film songs, she has also recorded numerous devotional, bhaavageethe and folk songs. For her song "O Priyatama" in the movie Urvashi, Chandrika won the Karnataka State Film Award for Best Female Playback Singer in 1994. Karnataka Government honoured her with the Karnataka Rajyotsava Award for her contribution to music, in 2010.

Personal life 
Chandrika was born on 4 October 1959 in Tumkur to Rangarao and Lalithamma. She graduated in sociology from the University of Mysore. She worked as a lecturer at Tumkur College for a short time.

Chandrika married Gururaja. The couple have a daughter.

Career 
Chandrika was first noticed by actor Shankar Nag in a program, who later introduced her to composer Hamsalekha. Hamsalekha gave her first song "Kadalige Ondu Kone Ide" in the movie Indrajith, a duet with singer S. P. Balasubrahmanyam. Then she went to record many film songs with S. P. Balasubrahmanyam, K. J. Yesudas, Mano, P. Jayachandran, L. N. Shastry, Rajesh Krishnan, Ramesh Chandra, and others.

She has worked with many composers including Hamsalekha, V. Manohar, Ilayaraja, Rajan–Nagendra, Upendra Kumar, Raj–Koti, Sadhu Kokila, Rajesh Ramnath, C. Ashwath, Jayashree Aravind and others.

She Has recorded more than 100 film songs and more than 1000 non - film songs.

Her notable songs are "Prema Baraha Koti Taraha", "Ee Jogada Jalapatha", "Thattona Thattona", "Mamarake E Kogileya", "Ba Baro O Geleya", "Chaitrada Premanjaliya", "Avannalli Ivalilli", "Sangama Sangama", "O Bandhuve", "Eniddarenu Hennada Balika", "Nenapugala Angaladi", "Hogabeda Hudugi" and many.

She was one of the jury members in the 2016 Karnataka state film award committee. She is active in performing on stages across the country.

Awards 
 2015 - Kempegowda Award by BBMP
 2010 - Karnataka Rajyotsava Award
 1995 - Karnataka State Film Award for Best Female Playback Singer

Discography

References

External links 

1959 births
Living people
Kannada playback singers
Indian women playback singers